The Union Wash Formation is a geologic formation in the Inyo Mountains, east of Lone Pine in Inyo County, California.

It is of the Early Triassic epoch in the Triassic Period, during the Mesozoic Era.

Fossils 
It preserves fossils dating back to the Triassic period.  They include Inyoites owenii, from the Meekoceras bed of the formation, and Ammonoids.

The sites are protected within the Southern Inyo Mountains Wilderness of the Inyo National Forest.

See also 

 List of fossiliferous stratigraphic units in California
 Paleontology in California

References 

Geologic formations of California
Triassic System of North America
Early Triassic
Triassic California
Geology of Inyo County, California
Inyo Mountains